Marousa Pappou (born 29 April 1978) is a Greek snowboarder. She competed in the women's giant slalom event at the 1998 Winter Olympics.

References

1978 births
Living people
Greek female snowboarders
Olympic snowboarders of Greece
Snowboarders at the 1998 Winter Olympics
Place of birth missing (living people)